Marius Iulian Cioiu (born 1 November 1999) is a Romanian professional footballer who plays as a right midfielder for Liga I club FC Botoșani.

Club career

Academica Clinceni
He made his league debut on 16 July 2021 in Liga I match against Sepsi OSK. Marius Iulian Cioiu continued to play for Academica Clinceni for the 2021-2022 season for the first round of matches.

FC Petrolul Ploiești
From February 2022, Marius Cioiu was moved to Liga II team FC Petrolul Ploiești. The Romanian Midfielder had 8 appearances during the season for FC Petrolul, a team which eventually finished in the first league position and qualified for the Liga I season of 2022-2023.

During the 2022-2023 season of Romanian Liga I, Marius Cioiu recorded a number of 10 appearances playing for FC Petrolul Ploiești, 8 of which was drawn in the first eleven and two substitutes in.

Honours
ACS Șirineasa
Liga III: 2017–18

Petrolul Ploiești
Liga II: 2021–22

References

External links
 
 

1999 births
Living people
Sportspeople from Târgu Jiu
Romanian footballers
Association football midfielders
Liga I players
Liga II players
ACS Viitorul Târgu Jiu players
LPS HD Clinceni players
FC Petrolul Ploiești players
FC Botoșani players